Beeli is a surname. Notable people with the surname include:

 Binia Feltscher-Beeli (born 1978), Swiss curler
 Gaudenz Beeli (born 1947), Swiss bobsledder
 Maurice Beeli (1879–1957), Belgian mycologist

See also
 Belli (surname)
 Meeli